Speed-dating may refer to:

 Speed dating, activity
 Speed Dating, a 2007 film by Tony Herbert
 Speed-Dating, a 2010 film by Joseph A. Elmore Jr.